is a three-episode Japanese original video animation.

Plot
May is the key to unlocking the deadliest weapon, known as the Dragoon. Early in the film, May is shown in a tube being controlled by two older men. She escapes and finds herself lost in the woods. While practicing his sword techniques, a young man named Sedon hears soldiers and airplanes nearby. He comes across a search party looking for May. Staying hidden behind a row of shrubbery, he starts to follow them before tripping over May, who is lying naked and unconscious on the floor.

Sedon takes May to his small cabin, built by his father, where she soon wakes up. The search party then finds the cabin and knocks on the door. Sedon and May escape just in time, but they are leaving tracks in the snow. To prevent being tracked, they run down a small nearby stream.  The Searchers lose the trail and Sedon takes May back to his village, where he discovers that she has amnesia, and remembers nothing.

Episodes

Characters
 
 
 Known as Sedon in the ADV dub.

 
 
 Known as May in the ADV dub.

 
 
 Sadie's younger sister.

 
 

 
 
 A sorceress seeking revenge from the Empire.

 
 
 Lilith's companion.

 
 

 
 
 Honorary Knight of the Empire.

 
 

 
 
 One of Randall's guards.

 
 

 
 

 
 
 Sadie's Father. Former commander of 

 
 
 Sadie's Mother.

References

External links 
 

1997 anime OVAs
ADV Films
Anime film and television articles using incorrect naming style
Animated series based on video games
Magic Bus (studio)